Lewisham railway station is located on the Main Suburban line, serving the Sydney suburb of Lewisham. It is served by Sydney Trains T2 Inner West & Leppington line services.

History
Lewisham station opened in 1886. The Main Suburban line through Lewisham was quadruplicated in 1892, and sextuplicated in 1927 in association with electrification works.

As part of the 1892 work, the northern side platform was converted to an island platform and a new platform constructed on the most northern line. The former was trimmed back to a single platform, and the latter demolished as part of the 1927 works. In September 1990, Lewisham closed for three months as the first station that CityRail upgraded.

Platforms & services

Transport links
Transit Systems operates one route via Lewisham station:
413: Railway Square to Campsie station

Lewisham station is served by one NightRide route:
N50: Liverpool station to Town Hall station

The Inner West Light Rail's Lewisham West stop is located 300 metres south-west of Lewisham station.

References

External links

Lewisham station details Transport for New South Wales

Railway stations in Australia opened in 1886
Railway stations in Sydney
Lewisham, New South Wales
Main Suburban railway line